Go, Man, Go! is a 1954 American sports film directed by James Wong Howe, starring Dane Clark, Sidney Poitier, Ruby Dee, Patricia Breslin, The Harlem Globetrotters and Slim Gaillard. Clark plays Abe Saperstein, the organizer of the Globetrotters.  Poitier's character is Inman Jackson, the team's showboating center. Breslin plays Sylvia Saperstein, the love interest, and Abe's daughter. Gaillard plays himself.

The film tracks the Globetrotters from humble beginnings through a triumph over a major-league basketball team, as they struggle to overcome racial discrimination. Actual Harlem Globetrotter players portray the team in basketball action throughout the picture. The friendship between Saperstein and Jackson, and their wives, is an important storyline.

Cast

Hollywood blacklist
Screenwriter and producer Alfred Palca was accused by the Federal Bureau of Investigation in 1953 of being a Communist. He refused to cooperate with their investigations. No distributor was willing to release the film with his name credited, so he gave the producing credit to his brother-in-law, Anton Leader, and the screenwriting credit to his cousin, Arnold Becker, a pediatrician. He never worked in the film industry again. According to Palca, the F.B.I. saw his casting of Poitier as further evidence of his Communism.

In 1997, a ceremony at the Academy Theatre honored blacklisted Hollywood writers and directors and restored Palca's writing credit for the film.

Reception
Bosley Crowther, reviewing the film for The New York Times, observed, "This is the second little picture in which the Globetrotters have been starred. The encore is not excessive. They still give an entertaining show."

The film is recognized by American Film Institute in these lists:
 2006: AFI's 100 Years...100 Cheers – Nominated

References

External links
 
 
 

1954 films
1950s sports drama films
American basketball films
American sports drama films
American black-and-white films
Biographical films about sportspeople
Cultural depictions of the Harlem Globetrotters
Films scored by Alex North
United Artists films
1954 directorial debut films
1954 drama films
1950s English-language films
1950s American films